David Bishop may refer to:

David Bishop (writer) (born 1966), New Zealand novelist, playwright and comics writer
David Bishop (runner) (born 1987), British Scottish international middle-distance athlete
David Bishop (gymnast) (born 1990), New Zealand artistic gymnast
Dave Bishop (rugby referee) (born 1948), New Zealand rugby union referee
David Bishop (rugby, born 1960), Welsh international rugby player during the 1980s
David Bishop (rugby union, born 1983), Welsh rugby union player
David Bishop (Neighbours), fictional character in Australian TV series Neighbours
David Bishop (British politician), leader of the Church of the Militant Elvis Party
David Bishop (Canadian politician) (1942–2017), Canadian politician and member of the Legislative Assembly of New Brunswick
David Bishop (American politician) (1929–2020), American lawyer, politician and member of the Minnesota House of Representatives